"I'm Thinking Tonight of My Blue Eyes" is the title of a country/folk song by A. P. Carter. A. P. Carter was a collector of old songs and lyrics. I'm Thinking Tonight of My Blue Eyes is one of these old songs he discovered and it is said to be adapted from "The Prisoner's Song" by Guy Massey. The song is a hillbilly folk song, the foundation of early country music. The song became a hit in 1929.  The song is a sad tale of a love that had been lost far across the sea, set to traditional English folk music.  

Due to the song's popularity and historical importance, many have covered the song, including Bing Crosby (recorded January 18, 1942),  Gene Autry, Burl Ives and The Andrews Sisters. Some artists shorten the title to Broken Ties or Broken Vows or Broken Hearted Lovers. In February 1939 on XET Station, Mexico, Sara Carter dedicated the song to her long lost boyfriend Coy Bays, who was in Washington State at the time. On February 20, 1939 Sara Carter and Coy Bayes married at Brackettville, Texas. Mother Maybelle used the Carter Family picking on the song, which was new at the time, the bass notes are played with her thumb and she strums with her other fingers. The song was later put on the Carter Family album: My Clinch Mountain Home: Their Complete Victor Recordings (1928–1929). Ralph Stanley in 2006 recorded a complete album of Carter Family songs, including "I'm Thinking Tonight of My Blue Eyes", titled A Distant Land to Roam: Songs of the Carter Family.

References

External links
Youtube The Carter Family, I'm Thinking Tonight of My Blue Eyes

American folk songs
Carter Family songs
Grammy Hall of Fame Award recipients
1935 songs
Songs written by A. P. Carter